The 2009 IAAF Road Race Label Events were the second edition of the global series of road running competitions given Label status by the International Association of Athletics Federations (IAAF). All five  World Marathon Majors had Gold Label status. The series included a total of 49 road races, 19 Gold and 30 Silver. In terms of distance, 34 races were marathons, 8 were half marathons, 5 were 10K runs, and 2 were held over other distances.

Races

References

Race calendar
Calendar 2009 IAAF Label Road Races. IAAF. Retrieved 2019-09-22.

2009
IAAF Road Race Label Events